StreetDance 2 is a 2012 3D British dance drama film and the sequel to StreetDance 3D (2010). The film has been released in RealD 3D, XpanD 3D and Dolby 3D with Max Giwa and Dania Pasquini returning to direct. Britain's Got Talent stars George Sampson and Flawless return along with hip-hop dancer Sofia Boutella (backing dancer for Madonna and face of Nike) and Falk Hentschel. The cast also features b-boys such as Lilou, Niek and Yaman. The film is a production of Vertigo Films in association with BBC Films.

Plot
To beat the world's best dance crew at a dance-off in Paris, France, German streetdancer Ash (Falk Hentschel) and new friend and manager, Eddie (George Sampson), gather the greatest streetdancers from around Europe, whilst hoping to add a Latin element courtesy of salsa dancer Eva (Sofia Boutella).  After a rough start, the group all agree to incorporate this element and have fun adding Latin to street dance; whilst doing this, Ash and Eva grow closer.  Two days before the big dance-off, Ash rejects Eva on the dance floor and refers to their fusion dance as a  "Little Latin Experiment" when they're up against "The Surge" (Flawless) in a friendly dance-off. The police come and break up the dance-off and Eva runs away. Ash chases her but she doesn't want to know. The next day Ash goes to apologise to Eva but meets her Uncle (Tom Conti) who tells Ash to leave. Ash comes back to explain when he finds Eva's Uncle on the floor.  He is rushed to the hospital where Eva meets him and Ash.  When Eva's Uncle wakes up, he tells Ash that he should go to the dance-off.  Ash and his crew leave for the dance-off and are frustrated to find the gates locked.  Ash gets them in wearing popcorn sellers' clothes.  They battle Invincible until the last dance where they need Eva.  She appears and does the dance as planned.  Ash and his crew finish, and are estatic to find they have won.  Invincible's leader then hands the trophy to Ash.  As everyone celebrates, Ash and Eva share a kiss.

Cast
 Falk Hentschel as Ash, the protagonist
 Sofia Boutella as Eva, Salsa/Latin dancer and romantic interest
 George Sampson as Eddie, Ash's manager
 Stephanie Nguyen "Lil Steph" as Steph, part of Ash's crew
 Delphine Nguyen "Deydey" as Yo-Yo, part of Ash's crew
 Niek Traa as Legend, part of Ash's crew
 Elisabetta Di Carlo "Betty Style" as Bam-Bam, part of Ash's crew
 Samuel Revell "BBoy Sambo" as Tino, part of Ash's crew
 Kaito Masai "Kite" as Terrabyte, part of Ash's crew
 Ali Ramdani "Lilou" as Ali, part of Ash's crew
 Ndedi Ma-Sellu "Dedson" as Killa, part of Ash's crew
 Brice Larrieu as Skorpion, part of Ash's crew
 Akai Osei as Junior, the youngest of Ash's crew who was 11
 Maykel Fonts as Lucien, Eva's dance partner
 Tom Conti as Manu, Eva's uncle
 Babbal Kumar as dark dancer
 Anwar Burton as Vince, the antagonist, leader of Invincible
 Flawless as dance crew "The Surge"
 Pablo Baez as Boxing Ring / Latin Party Couple 2

Release
The film was theatrically released on 30 March 2012 by Vertigo Films and was released on DVD and Blu-ray on 24 July 2012 by Entertainment One.

Reception
The film received generally mixed reviews. Rotten Tomatoes reported that 46% (Rotten) of critics gave this film positive reviews.

StreetDance 2 received its first review on 10 February 2012 with Screen International chief film critic, Mark Adams, describing the dancing as "toe-tappingly cool" and stating that lead actress Sofia Boutella is "destined to be a big star".

Box office results for the opening weekend (from Friday 30 March 2012) for Street Dance 2 showed the movie grossed £608,024 and placed fifth in the UK movie box office charts, a result that only managed a quarter of the success Streetdance 3D did, placing it behind The Hunger Games which remained the top-grossing movie for two weeks.

The film caused significant outrage among Algerians living in both France and Algeria due to their compatriot Sofia Boutella's appearance in scenes that are excessively risqué by Algerian standards. Viewing the film as an "insult to Algerian traditions and ethics," some Algerian immigrants in France boycotted the film and a campaign was launched through social networking sites Twitter and Facebook to prevent the showing of the film in Algeria.

Soundtrack
 We Will Rock You [LP & JC remix] – Queen
 Go in Go Hard Ft Wretch 32 – Angel	
 Domino – Jessie J	
 High & Low – Sunday Girl	
 Rockstar – Dappy	
 Who Says You Can't Have It All – Dionne Bromfield	
 Invincible – Anwar 'Fliistylz' Burton	
 Rack City – Tyga	
 Bow Wow Wow Ft Chipmunk – Bodyrox	
 Superbass – Nicki Minaj	
 Mama Do the Hump – Rizzle Kicks	
 The Motto Ft Lil Wayne – Drake	
 Troublemaker – Taio Cruz	
 Bright Lights Ft Pixie Lott – Tinchy Stryder
 Burning Benches – Morning Runner	
 Unorthodox Ft Example – Wretch 32	
 Apache – Incredible Bongo Band	
 Midnight Caller – Chase & Status	
 Bass Down Low Static Revenger Remix – Dev	
 Together – Herve	
 Hold On – Skepta	
 Baudelaires Tango – Lloyd Perrin & Jordan Crisp	
 Catacombs Remix – Lloyd Perrin & Jordan Crisp	
 Cuba 2012 Dj Rebel Streetdance 2 Remix – Latin Formation	
 Agua Remix – Los Van Van	
 Ride My Beat – Polluted Mindz

References

External links
 
 

2012 3D films
2012 films
2012 drama films
British 3D films
British drama films
IMAX films
Vertigo Films films
2010s dance films
2010s hip hop films
2010s English-language films
Films directed by Max Giwa
Films directed by Dania Pasquini
2010s British films